Corinnidae is a family of araneomorph spiders, sometimes called corinnid sac spiders. The family, like other "clubionoid" families, has a confusing taxonomic history. Once it was a part of the large catch-all taxon Clubionidae, now very much smaller.  The original members of the family are apparently similar only in that they have eight eyes arranged in two rows, conical anterior spinnerets that touch and are generally wandering predators that build silken retreats, or sacs, usually on plant terminals, between leaves, under bark or under rocks.

In 2014, Martín Ramírez recognized the family in a restricted sense, including only the subfamilies Corinninae and Castianeirinae. Two former subfamilies of the Corinnidae are now treated as separate families, Phrurolithidae and Trachelidae. As now recognized, Corinnidae contains 71 genera and over 800 species worldwide. Among the common genera are Castianeira (nearly world wide) and Corinna (widespread).

Members of the genus Castianeira appear to be mimics of ants and velvet ants.  Other corinnid ant-like genera include Mazax, Myrmecium and Myrmecotypus. Corinna is the type genus for the family and consists of small running spiders.

Genera

, the World Spider Catalog accepts the following genera:

Abapeba Bonaldo, 2000 — South America, Panama, Caribbean, Mexico
Aetius O. Pickard-Cambridge, 1897 — Asia, Côte d'Ivoire
Allomedmassa Dankittipakul & Singtripop, 2014 — Malaysia, Thailand, China
Apochinomma Pavesi, 1881 — South America, Africa, Asia
Arushina Caporiacco, 1947 — Tanzania
Attacobius Mello-Leitão, 1925 — Brazil, Argentina
Austrophaea Lawrence, 1952 — South Africa
Battalus Karsch, 1878 — Australia
Brachyphaea Simon, 1895 — Tanzania, Kenya, Mozambique
Cambalida Simon, 1910 — Africa, India
Castianeira Keyserling, 1879 — Central America, Asia, North America, South America, Africa, Europe, Cuba
Castoponera Deeleman-Reinhold, 2001 — Indonesia, Malaysia
Coenoptychus Simon, 1885 — Africa, Asia
Copa Simon, 1886 — Sri Lanka, Africa, Australia
Copuetta Haddad, 2013 — Africa
Corinna C. L. Koch, 1841 — Caribbean, South America, Africa, Papua New Guinea, Mexico, Central America, Pakistan
Corinnomma Karsch, 1880 — Asia, Saint Vincent and the Grenadines, Africa
Creugas Thorell, 1878 — Mexico, South America, Myanmar, Australia, Central America
Crinopseudoa Jocqué & Bosselaers, 2011 — Guinea, Liberia
Cycais Thorell, 1877 — Indonesia, Japan
Disnyssus Raven, 2015 — Australia
Echinax Deeleman-Reinhold, 2001 — Asia, Africa
Ecitocobius Bonaldo & Brescovit, 1998 — Brazil
Erendira Bonaldo, 2000 — Venezuela, Panama, Saint Vincent and the Grenadines
Falconina Brignoli, 1985 — South America, Panama, Cuba, United States
Fluctus Jin & Zhang , 2020 — China
Graptartia Simon, 1896 — Morocco, Algeria
Griswoldella Haddad, 2021 — Madagascar
Hortipes Bosselaers & Ledoux, 1998 — Africa
Humua Ono, 1987 — Japan
Ianduba Bonaldo, 1997 — Brazil, Argentina
Iridonyssus Raven, 2015 — Australia
Kolora Raven, 2015 — Australia
Leichhardteus Raven & Baehr, 2013 — Australia
Leptopicia Raven, 2015 — Australia
Mandaneta Strand, 1932 — Ghana, Congo
Mazax O. Pickard-Cambridge, 1898 — North America, Jamaica, Central America, Argentina
Medmassa Simon, 1887 — Asia, Oceania
Megalostrata Karsch, 1880 — Cuba, Mexico, Panama
Melanesotypus Raven, 2015 — Solomon Is.
Merenius Simon, 1910 — Africa, Yemen
Messapus Simon, 1898 — Africa
Methesis Simon, 1896 — South America
Myrmecium Latreille, 1824 — South America, Trinidad
Myrmecotypus O. Pickard-Cambridge, 1894 — North America, Argentina, Central America
Nucastia Raven, 2015 — Australia
Nyssus Walckenaer, 1805 — Australia, New Zealand, Fiji
Olbus Simon, 1880 — Chile
Ozcopa Raven, 2015 — Australia
Parachemmis Chickering, 1937 — Panama, South America
Paradiestus Mello-Leitão, 1915 — Brazil
Paramedmassa Jin, H. Zhang & F. Zhang, 2019 — Thailand, Laos, China
Poecilipta Simon, 1897 — Australia
Pranburia Deeleman-Reinhold, 1993 — Asia
Procopius Thorell, 1899 — Africa
Pronophaea Simon, 1897 — South Africa
Psellocoptus Simon, 1896 — Venezuela
Pseudocorinna Simon, 1910 — Africa
Scorteccia Caporiacco, 1936 — Libya
Septentrinna Bonaldo, 2000 — United States, Mexico, Guatemala
Serendib Deeleman-Reinhold, 2001 — Thailand, Indonesia
Simonestus Bonaldo, 2000 — South America, Central America, Mexico
Sphecotypus O. Pickard-Cambridge, 1895 — Asia, Nicaragua, Brazil
Spinirta Jin & Zhang, 2020 — China
Stethorrhagus Simon, 1896 — South America
Tapixaua Bonaldo, 2000 — Brazil, Peru
Ticopa Raven, 2015 — Australia
Tupirinna Bonaldo, 2000 — Brazil, Venezuela, Panama
Vendaphaea Haddad, 2009 — South Africa
Wasaka Haddad, 2013 — Africa
Xeropigo O. Pickard-Cambridge, 1882 — South America, Trinidad, United States

See also
 List of Corinnidae species

References

External links

 
Araneomorphae families